Marmara arbutiella is a moth of the family Gracillariidae. It is known from Canada and the United States (Oregon, Washington and California).

The larvae feed on Arbutus menziesii, Arbutus unedo and Arctostaphylos species. They mine the leaves of their host plant. The mine has the form of a very long, irregular, winding, serpentine mine just under the upper epidermis of the leaf. There are three behaviorally and morphologically distinct larval forms. There are six to eight sap-feeding and two non-feeding, structurally differentiated instars. The early instars are legless sap feeders. The first of the non-feeding instars never issues from the cuticle of the previous (feeding) instar. The second non-feeding stage is a fully legged, with rudimentary feeding structures and a functional spinneret. Upon issuing from the mine, this instar spins a cocoon that is elaborately decorated with clusters pearly bubbles that are extruded from its anus and then individually attached to the exterior of the cocoon.

References

External links
mothphotographersgroup
Bug Guide

Marmarinae
Moths described in 1904